Roman Yefimovich Kozak (June 29, 1957 in Vinnytsia – May 28, 2010 in Moscow) was a Russian theatre actor and director. Honored Artist of the Russian Federation (2000). He was artistic director of the Moscow Pushkin Drama Theatre.

Roman Kozak was married to choreographer Alla Sigalova.

References

External links
 Страница Романа Козака на сайте Театра имени Пушкина
 Roman Kozak. Biography — RIA Novosti, May 28, 2010
 Блог Романа Козака

1957 births
2010 deaths
Russian male actors
Russian theatre directors
Deaths from cancer in Russia
Deaths from laryngeal cancer
People from Vinnytsia
Honored Artists of the Russian Federation
Moscow Art Theatre School alumni
Academic staff of Moscow Art Theatre School
Burials in Troyekurovskoye Cemetery